Malcolm Anthony Williams (born 28 October 1938) is a Sri Lankan former swimmer. He competed in the men's 200 metre breaststroke at the 1960 Summer Olympics.  Williams was eliminated in the heats of the 1958 British Empire and Commonwealth Games 220 yards breaststroke.

References

External links
 

1938 births
Living people
Sri Lankan male swimmers
Olympic swimmers of Sri Lanka
Swimmers at the 1960 Summer Olympics
Commonwealth Games competitors for Sri Lanka
Swimmers at the 1958 British Empire and Commonwealth Games
Sportspeople from London
Sri Lankan people of English descent
Male breaststroke swimmers